The Mercury March was a song composed in 1974 by Major Albert Cornelius (Con) Furey. It is the march for the Communications and Electronics Branch of the Canadian Forces.

References

Canadian military marches
Military history of Canada
1974 compositions